Habibu Kinyogoli (born 2 October 1948) is a Tanzanian boxer. He competed in the men's featherweight event at the 1972 Summer Olympics. Kinyogoli also represented Tanzania at the 1970 and 1974 British Commonwealth Games. He won a silver medal in the 1973 All-Africa Games in the bantamweight category.

References

1948 births
Living people
Tanzanian male boxers
Olympic boxers of Tanzania
Boxers at the 1972 Summer Olympics
Commonwealth Games competitors for Tanzania
Boxers at the 1970 British Commonwealth Games
Boxers at the 1974 British Commonwealth Games
African Games silver medalists for Tanzania
African Games medalists in boxing
Place of birth missing (living people)
Boxers at the 1973 All-Africa Games
Bantamweight boxers